Fodé Bangoura is a Guinean political figure, once a key aide to president Lansana Conté.

References

Year of birth missing (living people)
Living people
Guinean politicians